The little red brocket or swamp brocket (Mazama rufina), also known as the Ecuador red brocket, is a small, little-studied deer native to the Andes of Colombia, Ecuador and northern Peru, where found in forest and páramo at altitudes between . It is one of the smallest brocket deer. The coat is reddish, and the legs and crown are blackish. As recently as 1999, some authorities included both the pygmy brocket (M. nana) and Merida brocket (M. bricenii) as subspecies of the little red brocket.

The little red brocket may have formed an important part of the diet of the people of the Pleistocene Las Vegas culture.

References

Mazama (genus)
Mammals of the Andes
Mammals of Colombia
Mammals of Ecuador
Mammals of Peru
Páramo fauna
Vulnerable animals
Vulnerable biota of South America
Mammals described in 1852
Taxa named by Jules Bourcier